Major Shaitan Singh Bhati, PVC (1 December 1924 – 18 November 1962) was an Indian Army officer and recipient of the Param Vir Chakra, India's highest military decoration. Singh was born in Rajasthan. On completing his graduation, Singh joined the Jodhpur State Forces. He was transferred to the Kumaon Regiment after the princely state of Jodhpur was merged into India. He took part in operations in the Naga Hills and also in the 1961 Indian annexation of Goa.

During the 1962 Sino-Indian War, 13th Battalion of Kumaon Regiment was stationed in the Chushul sector. C Company, under the command of Singh, was holding a position at Rezang La. In the morning hours of 18 November 1962, the Chinese attacked. After several unsuccessful attacks from the front, the Chinese attacked from the rear. The Indians fought until their last rounds, before eventually being overpowered by the Chinese. During the battle, Singh continuously moved from post to post reorganizing the defences and boosting the morale of his men. As he moved between the posts without any cover, he was seriously wounded, and later succumbed to his injuries. For his actions on 18 November 1962, Singh was awarded the Param Vir Chakra.

Early life
Shaitan Singh was born on 1 December 1924 in a Rajput family of Bhati clan in Banasar village, Jodhpur district, Rajasthan. His father was Lieutenant Colonel Hem Singh. Lt. Col. Singh served in France with the Indian Army during World War I, and was awarded the Order of the British Empire (OBE) by the British government.

Singh studied in the Chopasni Senior Secondary School, Jodhpur up to his matriculation. At school, he was known for his skills as a football player. After completing his schooling in 1943, Singh went to Jaswant College, and completed his graduation in 1947. On 1 August 1949, he joined the Jodhpur State Forces as an officer.

Military career
After the princely state of Jodhpur was merged into India, Singh was transferred to the Kumaon Regiment. He was promoted to captain on 25 November 1955, and took part in operations in Naga Hills and also in 1961 Indian annexation of Goa. On 11 June 1962, he was promoted to the rank of major.

1962 Sino-Indian War

There had long been disagreement between India and China over borders in the Himalaya region. To counter the increasing Chinese intrusions into disputed territory, then Prime Minister of India Jawaharlal Nehru asked for strategies for dealing with them. However, the proposal put forward by the Indian Army was rejected. Instead, he approved a plan proposed by a bureaucrat called the "Forward Policy". This called for the establishment of a number of small posts facing the Chinese. Due to the severe rise in public criticism against Chinese intrusions, Nehru implemented the "Forward Policy" against the advice of the army. The army's concern was that the Chinese had geographical advantage. Additionally, maintaining numerous small posts would be untenable if the Chinese superior forces attacked. This was ruled out by Nehru who believed the Chinese would not attack. But the Chinese did, initiating the Sino-Indian War.

Battle of Rezang La

In the morning hours of 18 November 1962, the Chinese attacked. Indians prepared for an offensive as they saw the Chinese advancing through nullahs in the dim dawn lighting. At 5:00am, as platoons got a better sight of the Chinese, they started firing with light machine guns, rifles, mortar, and grenades, killing many Chinese soldiers.

At 5:40am, the Indians were fired upon by artillery and mortar. Again, around three hundred and fifty Chinese soldiers started to advance through nullahs. As attacks from the vanguard were unsuccessful, around four hundred Chinese troops attacked from the rear. Simultaneously, No. 8 Platoon was fired upon with medium machine guns from the wire fencing of the post, and also received artillery and mortar fire. No. 7 Platoon was attacked by one hundred and twenty Chinese soldiers from the rear. The Indians countered with  mortar shells and killed many Chinese soldiers. As the last twenty survivors charged towards the post, the Indians jumped out of their trenches and engaged in hand-to-hand combat with the Chinese soldiers. However, the Platoon was soon encircled with the arrival of Chinese reinforcements. Eventually, No. 7 & 8 platoons were left with no survivors.

During the battle, Singh continuously moved from post to post reorganizing the defenses and boosting the morale of his men. As he moved between the posts without any cover, he was seriously wounded. While he was being evacuated by his soldiers, the Chinese started to fire heavily on them. Sensing the danger, Singh ordered the soldiers to leave. They placed him behind a boulder, where he succumbed to his injuries. In the battle, the Indian side suffered 114 casualties out of 120, whereas the Chinese side had a casualty of more than 3000 personnel. Singh's body was found at the same boulder. It was brought to Jodhpur and cremated with military honors.Chinese captured the five injured (who later escaped) and one man Captain Ramchander Yadav who had hidden Shaitan Singh's body within boulders came back to tell the story. Three months later after snow melted Red cross recovered his body with his gun still in his hands at that very location.

Param Vir Chakra
For his actions at the Battle of Rezang La, on 18 November 1962, Singh was awarded the Param Vir Chakra. The official citation read:

Legacy

In 1980s, the Shipping Corporation of India (SCI), a Government of India enterprise under the aegis of the Ministry of Shipping, named fifteen of its crude oil tankers in honour of the PVC recipients. The tanker MT Major Shaitan Singh, PVC was delivered to SCI in 1985, and served for 25 years before being phased out.

On 2017 a movie starring Shehzaad Khan as Shaitan Singh directed by Pankaj Sehgal was released.

Notes
Footnotes

Citations

References

Further reading

Indian military personnel killed in action
Recipients of the Param Vir Chakra
1924 births
1962 deaths
People from Jodhpur
Military personnel from Rajasthan
People of the Sino-Indian War